The Fifth Quarter (or 5th Quarter) is an addition to a whole normally divided into four parts.  It may refer to: 

 The Fifth Quarter (short story), written in 1972 by Stephen King
 The Fifth Quarter, an Australian rules football television program which began airing in 2004
 The 5th Quarter, a 2011 film written, directed and produced by Rick Bieber
The 5th Quarter, a marching band tradition played out primarily by HBCU bands, but also including:
 The University of Wisconsin Marching Band's Fifth Quarter, a traditional post-game band performance
The5thquarter.com, an online HBCU marching band forum named for this tradition
 Quinto quarto, offal as used in the cuisine of modern Rome
fifthquarter.net, an online blog and forum dedicated to American College Football